The Academy Theater is a historic theater in the southeast part of Portland, Oregon's Montavilla neighborhood, in the United States. The theater opened in 1948, was later used as office space during the 1970s, then returned to function as a theater in 2006 when the building was completely refurbished. A fire temporarily closed the building in 2018. The business became a first-run theater in 2022.

References

External links
 

1948 establishments in Oregon
Montavilla, Portland, Oregon
Southeast Portland, Oregon
Theatres completed in 1948
Theatres in Portland, Oregon